Corey Harned (born December 26, 1981) is an American lacrosse player who previously played for the Long Island Lizards and the New Jersey Pride of Major League Lacrosse. He played lacrosse and football at Sachem High School in Lake Ronkonkoma, N.Y.  He played in the NCAA for Johns Hopkins University. Harned is the younger brother of Chris Harned, who was an attackman for the Toronto Blue Jays from 1997 to 2000.

Sources

External links
Player page at New Jersey Pride's website

1981 births
American lacrosse players
Johns Hopkins Blue Jays men's lacrosse players
Living people
Major League Lacrosse players
People from Lake Ronkonkoma, New York